The Steadfast Tin Soldier is a 1976 Soviet animated film, adaptation of the fairy tale by Hans Christian Andersen. Created by Soyuzmultfilm Studio.

Cast
 Maria Vinogradova as tin soldier
 Aleksey Konsovsky as narrator
 Sergey Zeitz as troll / rat

The song in the film is performed by Elena Kamburova.

References

External links
 The Steadfast Tin Soldier at the Animator.ru

 

1976 films
Russian animated short films
Soviet animated films
Soyuzmultfilm
Films about toys
Films based on works by Hans Christian Andersen
Works based on The Steadfast Tin Soldier
Films based on fairy tales